Felton Stratton (November 3, 1895 – December 25, 1974) was an American baseball infielder in the Negro leagues. He played from 1920 to 1933 with several teams.

References

External links
 and Baseball-Reference Black Baseball stats and Seamheads
  and Seamheads

1895 births
1974 deaths
Birmingham Black Barons players
Milwaukee Bears players
Chicago American Giants players
20th-century African-American sportspeople
Baseball infielders